The 2017 Inter-Provincial Trophy was the fifth edition of the Inter-Provincial Trophy, a Twenty20 cricket competition played in Ireland. It was held from 26 May to 11 August 2017. It was the first edition of the competition to be played with full Twenty20 status, following the outcome of a meeting by the International Cricket Council (ICC) in October 2016. In April 2017, Cricket Ireland approved the participation of a fourth team, Munster Reds, for the tournament. Leinster Lightning won the tournament, after beating Munster Reds by five wickets in the final round of fixtures.

Points table
The following teams competed:

 Champions

Fixtures

Round 1

Round 2

Round 3

Round 4

Round 5

Round 6

References

External links
 Series home at ESPN Cricinfo

Inter
Inter-Provincial Trophy seasons